Barney S. Graham is an American immunologist, virologist, and clinical trials physician. He is the deputy director of the Vaccine Research Center and the chief of the Viral Pathogenesis Laboratory. He was elected a member of the National Academy of Sciences in 2022.

Early life and education
Graham attended Paola High School in Paola, Kansas, where he was graduated as valedictorian in 1971 before enrolling at Rice University to major in biology for his bachelor of science degree. He earned a medical degree from the University of Kansas School of Medicine in 1979. Graham met his wife, Cynthia Turner-Graham, during medical school and they wished to complete residencies in the same community. He interviewed at Vanderbilt University and accepted a residency there while Turner-Graham accepted her residency at Meharry Medical College, also in Nashville, Tennessee. Graham completed his internship, residency, two chief residencies, and an infectious diseases fellowship at Vanderbilt. His college roommate was pediatrician William C. Gruber.

Career

By 1982, Graham was appointed chief resident at Nashville General Hospital, where he treated Tennessee's first AIDS patient. Following this, he was named to a chief residency at Vanderbilt University Medical Center, where he led the first human trial on the AIDS vaccine. The results of the trial found that the two experimental AIDS vaccines proved to yield the best immune response in patients. During his time at Vanderbilt, Graham was working simultaneously on his Ph.D. in microbiology.

Graham was elected a member of the American Society for Clinical Investigation in 1996. In 2000, the National Institutes of Health (NIH) recruited him to create a vaccine evaluation clinic (Vaccine Research Center), but he insisted on maintaining a research laboratory to focus on vaccines for three categories of respiratory viruses. During the 2015–2016 Zika virus epidemic, Graham and Ted Pierson, chief of the Laboratory of Viral Diseases, collaborated to create a vaccine intended to prevent the Zika virus. Moving from inception to manufacturing in just three months, they began a Phase 2 clinical trial in March 2017 to measure its effectiveness. In recognition of their efforts, they were finalists for the 2018 Promising Innovations Medal. In 2021 he received the Albany Medical Center Prize. In 2022 he was awarded the John J. Carty Award for the Advancement of Science of the NAS.

By 2017, working alongside Jason McLellan, a structural biologist, they discovered that "adding two prolines to a key joint of a vaccine's spike protein could stabilize the structure's prefusion shape" (patent WO2018081318A1). Later, this method would be applied to the COVID-19 vaccine. During the COVID-19 pandemic, Graham's laboratory partnered with Moderna to develop vaccine technology. He was a member of the research team that designed a spike protein to combat the virus.

His research found that some virus proteins change shape after they break into a person's cells, leading to the design of a better vaccine against respiratory syncytial virus.

Personal life
Graham is married to Cynthia Turner-Graham, also a physician. She specializes in psychiatry. They have three adult children.

References

External links

Living people
Members of the American Society for Clinical Investigation
Rice University alumni
University of Kansas alumni
Vanderbilt University faculty
American immunologists
Vaccinologists
Members of the United States National Academy of Sciences
1961 births